The Van Wagoner was an American electric automobile manufactured between 1899 and 1903 in Syracuse, New York, by the Syracuse Automobile Company. It was advertised as "built on a simple plan that does away with several levers and push buttons" and could purportedly be "controlled with one hand."

During 1900 the model was renamed to the Syracuse and was produced under that name until 1903. There were a number of reported problems with the car in 1901 because the rear brake compressor periodically gave out.

References

External links
 1899 Van Wagnor Electric Runabout Automobile

Defunct motor vehicle manufacturers of the United States
Motor vehicle manufacturers based in Syracuse, New York
Defunct companies based in Syracuse, New York
Vehicle manufacturing companies disestablished in 1903
1899 establishments in New York (state)
Vehicle manufacturing companies established in 1899
American companies established in 1899
1903 disestablishments in New York (state)